Micronuclearia is a genus of free-living protozoa. While originally thought to be a nucleariid, as reflected in the name, it is now inferred to be a member of the taxon Rigifilida, and to belong to the 'CRuMs' assemblage (whereas nucleariids are opisthokonts).

The type species is Micronuclearia podoventralis.

References

Podiata
Eukaryote genera